Thiophosphates (or phosphorothioates, PS) are chemical compounds and anions with the general chemical formula  (x = 0, 1, 2, or 3) and related derivatives where organic groups are attached to one or more O or S.  Thiophosphates feature tetrahedral phosphorus(V) centers.

Organic

Organothiophosphates are a subclass of organophosphorus compounds that are structurally related to the inorganic thiophosphates. Common members have formulas of the type (RO)3−xRxPS and related compounds where RO is replaced by RS.  Many of these compounds are used as insecticides, some have medical applications, and some have been used as oil additives.

Oligonucleotide phosphorothioates (OPS) are modified oligonucleotides where one of the oxygen atoms in the phosphate moiety is replaced by sulfur. They are the basis of antisense therapy, e.g., the drugs fomivirsen (Vitravene), oblimersen, alicaforsen, and mipomersen (Kynamro).

Inorganic

The simplest thiophosphates have the formula [PS4−xOx]3−.  These trianions are only observed at very high pH, instead they exist in protonated form with the formula [HnPS4−xOx](3−n)− (x = 0, 1, 2, or 3 and (n = 1, 2, or 3).

Monothiophosphate

Monothiophosphate is the anion [PO3S]3−, which has C3v symmetry.  A common salt is sodium monothiophosphate (Na3PO3S). Monothiophosphate is used in research as an analogue of phosphate in biochemistry. Monothiophosphate esters are biochemical reagents used in the study of transcription, substitution interference assays.  Sometimes, "monothiophosphate" refers to esters such as (CH3O)2POS−.

Dithiophosphates
Dithiophosphate has the formula [PO2S2]3−, which has C2v symmetry. Sodium dithiophosphate, which is colorless, is the major product from the reaction of phosphorus pentasulfide with NaOH:
P2S5  +  6 NaOH   →   2 Na3PO2S2  +  H2S  +  2 H2O

Dithiophosphoric acid is obtained by treatment of barium dithiophosphate with sulfuric acid:
Ba3(PO2S2)2  +  3 H2SO4   →   3 BaSO4  +  2 H3PO2S2
Both Na3PO2S2 and especially H3PO2S2 are prone toward hydrolysis to their monothio derivatives.

Tri- and tetrathiophosphates
Trithiophosphate is the anion [POS3]3−, which has C3v symmetry.  Tetrathiophosphate is the anion [PS4]3−, which has Td symmetry.

PxSy: binary thiophosphates and polyphosphates

A number of these anions known. Some have attracted interest as components in fast ion conductors for use in solid state batteries. The binary thiophosphates do not exhibit the extensive diversity of the analogous oxyanions but contain similar structural features, for example P is 4 coordinate, P−S−P links form and there are P−P bonds. One difference is that ions may include polysulfide fragments of 2 or more S atoms whereas in the P−O anions there is only the reactive −O−O−, peroxo, unit. 
 is the analogue of the nitrate ion,  (there is no  analogue); it was isolated as the yellow tetraphenylarsonium salt
 the pyrothiophosphate ion consisting of two corner sharing PS4 tetrahedra, analogous to the pyrophosphates.
 An ion which can be visualised either as two PS4 tetrahedra joined by a disulfide link or a pyrothiophosphate where the bridging −S− is replaced by −S4−.
 edge-shared bitetrahedral structure. The structure is therefore similar to the isoelectronic Al2Cl6 dimer. The oxygen analogue, dimetaphosphate , in contrast, is not known, the metaphosphates favour polymeric structures of chains or rings. 
P2S These form water-stable salts. The anion has an ethane-like structure and contains a P−P bond. The formal oxidation state of phosphorus is +4. The oxygen analogue is the hypodiphosphate anion, .
 contains a six-membered P3S3 ring. The ammonium salt is produced by reaction of P4S10 in liquid ammonia. Another way of visualising the structure is that it is the P4S10 adamantane (P4O10) structure with a PS3+ vertex removed.
 contains a square P4 ring,  contains a P5 ring and  a P6 ring.  These  cyclic anions contain P with an oxidation state +3. Note they are not trigonal as arsenic(III) is in arsenites, but are tetrahedral with two bonds to other phosphorus atoms and two to sulfur. The  anion is analogous to the  ring anion.
 An unusual butterfly-shaped ion, SP(P2)PS, which can be visualised as a P4 molecule where two P−S bonds replace one P−P bond.
 is a sulfido heptaphosphane cluster anion.

References

 
Anions
Sulfur ions
Functional groups